Maggie Cheung Ho-yee (born 20 March 1969) is a Hong Kong actress.

Career
Maggie Cheung Ho-yee competed in TVB's 1994 Miss Hong Kong beauty pageant, reaching the final five but not placing. However she did gain a special award for best "potential artist" (最具演藝潛質獎) and was signed to the channel soon afterwards.

Her career spun off to a whirlwind of a start, as she was offered a leading role. However, she wanted to start from the bottom up and hence declined the role, only to accept a subsidiary role in another series. Many will say that her career kicked off with the well accepted Old Time Buddy, but some others say it is with her primary leading role in "One Good Turn Deserves Another".

The popularity of artists in the Hong Kong television market depends as much on the popularity of the characters in a series as to the ability of the actors and it was not until 1998 that she achieved mainstream popularity with the series "Old Time Buddy", in which she played a character based on 60s teen idol Connie Chan Po-chu. The character was well received because of Maggie's excellent portrayal of Connie Chan. The immense success lead to sequel, To Catch A Thief, a movie, Those Were The Days, and even a platinum selling CD.

She has co-starred with numerous male actors, such as Gallen Lo, Louis Koo, Wong He, Roger Kwok, Steven Ma, Joe Ma, Moses Chan, Gordon Lam, and numerous others. Her chemistry with Gallen Lo lead to several other pairings in other series. Gordon Lam worked with Maggie Cheung in Plain Love II, which built a strong friendship amongst the two.

In 2003, she won the most coveted award a TVB actress can receive, Favorite Lead Actress, beating other "fa dan", a Cantonese term borrowed from Cantonese operas and roughly corresponding to modern notions of main actresses, such as Jessica Hsuan, Flora Chan, and Kenix Kwok. In 2004, she was in the race for the award again with new series that included "The Conqueror's Story" and "War and Beauty". However, the filming for the Jackie Chan/Stanley Kwan's project "To Live to Love" (Chang Hen Ge), interfered with the award ceremony, and Gigi Lai won the award.

In 2005, she was diagnosed with the rare Graves' Disease, preventing her from filming "Au Revoir Shanghai" and she was replaced by Anne Heung. After a break from showbiz for 2 years, she has just recovered and Maggie has said in an interview that she would be filming a new drama series in August 2007. Her numerous fans worldwide are avidly awaiting the release of a new drama from Cheung Ho Yee. Maggie also hosted the Mr Hong Kong 2007 contest with Dodo Cheng.

In 2010, Maggie became a spokesperson for the French's anti-aging skincare brand, RoC®.

Filmography

TV series

Films

References

External links
Official Sina Blog of Maggie Cheung
Official Yahoo! Blog of Maggie Cheung
Maggie Cheung on Sina Weibo

Hong Kong television actresses
TVB veteran actors
1969 births
Living people
Hong Kong film actresses
20th-century Hong Kong actresses
21st-century Hong Kong actresses